Alexander Sundberg (born January 19, 1981) is a Danish retired ice hockey player who participated at the 2010 IIHF World Championship as a member of the Denmark national men's ice hockey team.

References

External links

1981 births
Living people
Danish ice hockey left wingers
Sportspeople from Copenhagen